Henderson Bluff is a rock bluff,  high, along the west side of Lexington Table  north of Mount Lechner, in the Forrestal Range of the Pensacola Mountains, Antarctica. It was mapped by the United States Geological Survey from surveys and U.S. Navy air photos, 1956–66, and was named by the Advisory Committee on Antarctic Names for John R. Henderson, a geophysicist in the Pensacola Mountains, 1965–66.

References

Cliffs of Queen Elizabeth Land